Cellules Communistes Combattantes (CCC; Communist Combatant Cells, also known as Fighting Communist Cells) was a Communist Belgian urban guerrilla organization.

The cells were active for less than two years in the mid-1980s; primarily engaged in bombings within Belgium's borders. CCC attacked perceived enemies of communism, specifically NATO, US and other international businesses and the Federation of Belgian Enterprises. The Cellules Communistes Combattantes primarily targeted property rather than human representatives of capitalism, NATO, etc., and warned authorities ahead of an attack. Nevertheless, CCC bombings led to several injuries and two deaths.

The CCC's spate of bombings in 1985, as well as the unrelated Brabant killings at the time, shook this otherwise relatively tranquil country and created widespread security concerns. The government decided to deploy about 1,000 soldiers from the Belgian army as part of PM Wilfried Martens' security plan.

In December 1985, police arrested CCC leader and founder Pierre Carette and others, in an American-styled burger restaurant. Carette's conviction on 14 January 1986 essentially eliminated the CCC.

Pierre Carette was released from prison in February 2003. In 2008, Carette and Bertrand Sassoye were arrested again on parole violations and connections to the Italian terrorist group Partito Comunista Politico-Militare, but they were released by the court a few days later, on 18 June.

Convicted members
 Pierre Carette
 Bertrand Sassoye
 Pascale Vandegeerde
 Didier Chevolet
 Didier Sampieri

Attacks
 2 October 1984 – attack against the American company Litton Industries in Evere, on the 2nd anniversary of the Litton Industries bombing in Canada
 3 October 1984 – attack on the German company MAN AG in Groot-Bijgaarden
 8 October 1984 – attack on the American company Honeywell in Evere
 15 October 1984 – attack on the Paul Hymans institute (a liberal organization in Ixelles)
 17 October 1984 – attack on the CVP party bureau in Ghent
 26 October 1985 – attack on the Belgian military base in 
 11 December 1984 – attack on NATO pipelines in Ensival, Gages, Glaaien and Itter
 15 January 1985 – attack on a NATO/SHAPE support group in Woluwe-Saint-Lambert
 1 May 1985 – attack on the Federation of Belgian Enterprises, killing two firefighters and wounding 13 others
 6 May 1985 – attack on the Belgian police in Woluwe-Saint-Lambert
 8 October 1985 – attack on the Belgian company Sibelgaz in Laeken
 12 October 1985 – attack on the Belgian company Fabrimetal in Charleroi
 4 November 1985 – attack on the Belgian company BBL in Etterbeek
 4 November 1985 – attack on the American company Manufacturers Hanover Corporation
 4 November 1985 – attack on the Belgian company Generale Bank in Charleroi
 5 November 1985 – attack on the Belgian company KB Bank in Leuven
 5 November 1985 – attack on the American company Motorola in Watermael-Boitsfort
 4 December 1985 – attack on the American company Bank of America in Antwerp
 6 December 1985 – attack on a NATO pipeline in Wortegem-Petegem

See also
Communist terrorism
Gang of Nivelles
Revolutionary Front for Proletarian Action
Westland New Post

References

Defunct communist militant groups
Paramilitary organisations based in Belgium
Communism in Belgium
Communist organizations in Europe
Red Brigades
Far-left politics
Terrorist incidents in Belgium in the 1980s
Terrorism in Belgium
1980s in Belgium
1983 establishments in Belgium
Communist terrorism
1980s crimes in Belgium
Political controversies in Belgium